Alisma nanum is a species of plant in the Alismataceae. It is endemic to Xinjiang in western China, where it grows in marshes at elevations of about 600 m.

References

External links

nanum
Freshwater plants
Endemic flora of China
Flora of Xinjiang
Plants described in 1992